Worcester Recovery Center and Hospital is a 320-bed hospital opened on 16 August 2012 in Worcester, Massachusetts that replaces both Worcester State Hospital and part of Taunton State Hospital since some is still in use. This hospital aims to be recovery driven in the aspect of finding alternative and productive methods to help individuals who struggle with a psychiatric diagnosis.

References

Hospital buildings completed in 2012
Hospitals in Worcester, Massachusetts